Tal-e Siyah-ye Bid Anjir (also Romanized as Tal-e Sīyāh-ye Bīd Ānjīr; also known as Tal-e Sīyāh) is a village in Poshteh-ye Zilayi Rural District, Sarfaryab District, Charam County, Kohgiluyeh and Boyer-Ahmad Province, Iran. At the 2006 census, its population was 68, in 12 families.

References 

Populated places in Charam County